UED may stand for

 United Earth Directorate, within the context of the Races of StarCraft
 User Environment Design, as a component of Contextual design
 User Empowering Design, within the context of Human–computer interaction
 Ultrafast electron diffraction